Hollywood is a 1923 American silent comedy film directed by James Cruze, co-written by Frank Condon and Thomas J. Geraghty, and released by Paramount Pictures. The film is a lengthier feature follow-up to Paramount's own short film exposé of itself, A Trip to Paramountown from 1922.

The film has become famous as having featured cameos of more than fifty famous Hollywood stars. However, the film is now considered a lost film.

Plot 
Angela Whitaker (Hope Drown) is a young unknown who comes to Hollywood to become an actress, and brings her grandfather, Joel Whitaker (Luke Cosgrave). At the end of the first day, she has not found work, but her grandfather has.

Cast 

 Hope Drown as Angela Whitaker
 Luke Cosgrave as Joel Whitaker
 George K. Arthur as Lem Lefferts
 Ruby Lafayette as Grandmother Whitaker
 Harris Gordon as Dr. Luke Morrison
 Bess Flowers as Hortense Towers
 Eleanor Lawson as Margaret Whitaker
 King Zany as Horace Pringle

Cameos

See also 
 List of lost films
 Fascinating Youth
 Mary of the Movies
 Show People
 Souls for Sale
 A Trip to Paramountown

References

External links 

 
 Hollywood at SilentEra

1923 films
1923 comedy films
Silent American comedy films
American silent feature films
American black-and-white films
Famous Players-Lasky films
Films about actors
Films directed by James Cruze
Films set in Los Angeles
Films shot in Los Angeles
Lost American films
Paramount Pictures films
Films about Hollywood, Los Angeles
1923 lost films
Lost comedy films
1920s American films
1920s English-language films